SCIRA is the acronym by which the Snipe Class International Racing Association is known. SCIRA is the governing body of the Snipe international class in the sport of sailing recognized by the International Sailing Federation.

History 
SCIRA was established in November 1932, and Hub E. Isaacks of Snipe fleet number 1 at Dallas Sailing Club was the first commodore. In march, 1933, SCIRA chartered fleet number 8 to the Royal Cinque Ports Yacht Club in Dover Harbour, Kent, becoming the first fleet established outside the United States. By 1936, the Snipe Class became the world's largest racing class.

Board officers 
Jerelyn Biehl, the paid, full time Executive Director, runs the Snipe Class International Racing Association (SCIRA) office.

The SCIRA Board of Governors holds bi-annual meetings, usually during the World Championship.

Commodores 
Former SCIRA commodores:

References

Snipe (dinghy)
Sailing governing bodies
International sports organizations